Turkey Creek is a creek and tributary of the Econlockhatchee River located in the community of Narcoossee in Southeast Orlando, in the U.S. State of Florida. The source of the  river is Turkey Creek Bay, which is the northern beginning of the Econlockhatchee River Swamp that extends to Lake Conlin, the source of the Econlockhatchee River. From Turkey Creek Bay, the creek flows north and goes under Wewahootee Road and then State Road 528, commonly known as the Beachline Expressway.

See also
List of rivers of Florida

References

Econlockhatchee River
Rivers of Orange County, Florida
Rivers of Florida